Gongnong Township is a township under the administration of Longshan District, Liaoyuan, Jilin, China. , it has 7 villages under its administration.

References 

Township-level divisions of Jilin
Liaoyuan